Cidarina cidaris, common name Adam's spiny margarite, is a species of sea snail, a marine gastropod mollusk in the family Eucyclidae.

Description
The height of the gray to grayish white shell attains 20 mm.

(Original description in Latin by Carpenter) "Testa magna, conica, Turcicoidea, tenui ; albido-cinerea, nacreo-argentata ; anfr. nucleosis —? (decollatis), norm, vii, subplanatis, suturis alte insculptis ; superficie spirae tota valide tuberculosa, seriebus tribus, alteris postea intercalantibus; peripheria et basi rotundatis, carinatis; carinis circ. 8, haud acutis, irregularibus, scabris, haud tuberculosis; lacuna umbilicali vix conspicua ; apertura subrotundata ; labro tenuissimo; labio obsoleto ; columella arcuata. "

Distribution
This species occurs in the Pacific Ocean from Alaska to Baja California.

References

 Carpenter (1864), Ann. and Mag. N. H. xiv (3d ser.), p. 426.

External links
 To Barcode of Life (8 barcodes)
 To Biodiversity Heritage Library (8 publications)
 To Encyclopedia of Life
 To USNM Invertebrate Zoology Mollusca Collection
 To ITIS
 To World Register of Marine Species
 

cidaris
Gastropods described in 1864